Rex Babin (August 17, 1962 – March 30, 2012) was an American editorial cartoonist. He worked for The Denver Post from 1988 to 1989; the Times Union; and The Sacramento Bee from 1999 to 2012.

Life and career
Rex Babin was born on August 17, 1962 in Los Angeles, California. His father died when he was 4 years old and he was primarily raised my his mother. Babin graduated with a B.A. (1985) in English from San Diego State University. He was a strong advocate for the use of local cartoons, and typically drew three cartoons about California subjects per week.

In 1988 to 1989 Babin worked at The Denver Post in an interim capacity. Afterwards, he served as the editorial cartoonist of the Albany Times Union, before taking a position as a political cartoonist for The Sacramento Bee in 1999, replacing retiring cartoonist Dennis Renault. His innovative cartoons include "Caleeforneeya," a recurring satire of California Governor Arnold Schwarzenegger. Babin was the recipient of the National Press Foundation's 2001 Berryman Award; and a finalist for the Pulitzer Prize in 2003.

In 2009, Babin served as president of the Association of American Editorial Cartoonists.

Death and legacy 
Babin died from complications of stomach cancer at the age of 49. 

A few months after his death, his colleague Jack Ohman took the role of editorial cartoonist at The Sacramento Bee. The California Museum held a posthumous exhibition of his art, Drawing Caleeforneeya: Political Cartoons of Rex Babin, 1999-2012 (2018).

References

External links
 Rex Babin's Favorite Cartoons posthumous slideshow.
 Obituary for Rex Babin in the Sacramento Bee newspaper

2012 deaths
American cartoonists
Deaths from cancer in California
American caricaturists
1962 births